Diverticulitis, specifically colonic diverticulitis, is a gastrointestinal disease characterized by inflammation of abnormal pouches—diverticula—which can develop in the wall of the large intestine. Symptoms typically include lower abdominal pain of sudden onset, but the onset may also occur over a few days. There may also be nausea; and diarrhea or constipation. Fever or blood in the stool suggests a complication. Repeated attacks may occur.

The causes of diverticulitis are unclear. Risk factors may include obesity, lack of exercise, smoking, a family history of the disease, and use of nonsteroidal anti-inflammatory drugs (NSAIDs). The role of a low fiber diet as a risk factor is unclear. Having pouches in the large intestine that are not inflamed is known as diverticulosis. Inflammation occurs in between 10% and 25% at some point in time, and is due to a bacterial infection. Diagnosis is typically by CT scan, though blood tests, colonoscopy, or a lower gastrointestinal series may also be supportive. The differential diagnoses include irritable bowel syndrome.

Preventive measures include altering risk factors such as obesity, inactivity, and smoking. Mesalazine and rifaximin appear useful for preventing attacks in those with diverticulosis. Avoiding nuts and seeds as a preventive measure is no longer recommended since there is no evidence these play a role in initiating inflammation in diverticula. For mild diverticulitis, antibiotics by mouth and a liquid diet are recommended. For severe cases, intravenous antibiotics, hospital admission, and complete bowel rest may be recommended. Probiotics are of unclear value. Complications such as abscess formation, fistula formation, and perforation of the colon may require surgery.

The disease is common in the Western world and uncommon in Africa and Asia. In the Western world about 35% of people have diverticulosis while it affects less than 1% of those in rural Africa, and 4 to 15% of those may go on to develop diverticulitis.  In North America and Europe the abdominal pain is usually on the left lower side (sigmoid colon), while in Asia it is usually on the right (ascending colon). The disease becomes more frequent with age, ranging from 5% for those under 40 years of age to 50% over the age of 60. It has also become more common in all parts of the world. In 2003 in Europe, it resulted in approximately 13,000 deaths. It is the most frequent anatomic disease of the colon. Costs associated with diverticular disease were around US $2.4 billion a year in the United States in 2013.

Signs and symptoms
Diverticulitis typically presents with lower quadrant abdominal pain of a sudden onset. Patients commonly have elevated C-reactive protein and a high white blood cell count. In North America and Europe the abdominal pain is usually on the left lower side (sigmoid colon), while in Asia it is usually on the right (ascending colon). There may also be fever, nausea, diarrhea or constipation, and blood in the stool.

Complications

In complicated diverticulitis, an inflamed diverticulum can rupture, allowing bacteria to subsequently infect externally from the colon. If the infection spreads to the lining of the abdominal cavity (the peritoneum), peritonitis results. Sometimes, inflamed diverticula can cause narrowing of the bowel, leading to an obstruction. In some cases, the affected part of the colon adheres to the bladder or other organs in the pelvic cavity, causing a fistula, or creating an abnormal connection between an organ and adjacent structure or another organ (in the case of diverticulitis, the colon, and an adjacent organ).Related pathologies may include:
 Bowel obstruction
 Peritonitis
 Abscess
 Fistula
 Bleeding
 Strictures

Causes
The causes of diverticulitis are poorly understood, with approximately 40 percent due to genes and 60 percent due to environmental factors. Conditions that increase the risk of developing diverticulitis include arterial hypertension and immunosuppression. Obesity is another risk factor. Low levels of vitamin D are associated with an increased risk of diverticulitis.

Diet
It is unclear what role dietary fiber plays in diverticulitis. It is often stated that a diet low in fiber is a risk factor; however, the evidence to support this is unclear. There is no evidence to suggest that the avoidance of nuts and seeds prevents the progression of diverticulosis to an acute case of diverticulitis. In fact, it appears that a higher intake of nuts and corn could help to avoid diverticulitis in adult males.

Pathology
Right-sided diverticula are micro-hernias of the colonic mucosa and submucosa through the colonic muscular layer where blood vessels penetrate it. Left-sided diverticula are pseudodiverticula, since the herniation is not through all the layers of the colon. Diverticulitis is postulated to develop because of changes inside the colon, including high pressures because of abnormally vigorous contractions.

Diagnosis

People with the above symptoms are commonly studied with computed tomography, or a CT scan. Ultrasound can provide preliminary investigation for diverticulitis. Amongst the findings that can be seen on ultrasound is non-compressing outpouching of bowel wall, hypoechoic and thickened wall, or there is obstructive fecalith at the bowel wall. Besides, bowel wall oedema with adjacent hyperechoic mesentery can also be seen on ultrasound. However, CT scan is the mainstay of diagnosing diverticulitis and its complications. The diagnosis of acute diverticulitis is made confidently when the involved segment contains diverticula. CT images reveal localized colon wall thickening, with inflammation extending into the fat surrounding the colon. Amongst the complications that can be seen on CT scan are: abscesses, perforation, pylephlebitis, intestinal obstruction, bleeding, and fistula.

Barium enema and colonoscopy are contraindicated in the acute phase of diverticulitis because of the risk of perforation.

Classification by severity
Four classifications by severity have been published recently in the literature. The most recent and widely accepted is as follows:
 Stage 0  – asymptomatic diverticulosis
 Stage 1a – uncomplicated diverticulitis
 Stage 1b – diverticulitis with phlegmonous peridiverticulitis
 Stage 2a – diverticulitis with concealed perforation, and abscess with a diameter of one centimeter or less
 Stage 2b – diverticulitis with abscess greater than one centimeter
 Stage 3a – diverticulitis with symptoms but without complications
 Stage 3b – relapsing diverticulitis without complications
 Stage 3c – relapsing diverticulitis with complications

The severity of diverticulitis can be radiographically graded by the Hinchey Classification.

Differential diagnoses
The differential diagnoses include colon cancer, inflammatory bowel disease, ischemic colitis, and irritable bowel syndrome, as well as a number of urological and gynecological processes. In those with uncomplicated diverticulitis, cancer is present in less than 1% of people.

Treatment
Most cases of simple, uncomplicated diverticulitis respond to conservative therapy with bowel rest.

Diet
People may be placed on a low-fiber diet. It was previously thought that a low-fiber diet gives the colon adequate time to heal. Evidence tends to run counter to this, with a 2011 review finding no evidence for the superiority of low-fiber diets in treating diverticular disease, and that a high-fiber diet may prevent diverticular disease. A systematic review published in 2012 found no high-quality studies, but found that some studies and guidelines favour a high-fiber diet for the treatment of symptomatic disease. While it has been suggested that probiotics may be useful for treatment, the evidence currently neither supports nor refutes this claim.

Antibiotics
Mild uncomplicated diverticulitis without systemic inflammation should not be treated with antibiotics. For mild, uncomplicated, and non-purulent cases of acute diverticulitis, symptomatic treatment, IV fluids, and bowel rest have no worse outcome than surgical intervention in the short and medium term, and appear to have the same outcomes at 24 months. With abscess confirmed by CT scan, some evidence and clinical guidelines tentatively support the use of oral or IV antibiotics for smaller abscesses (<5 cm) without systemic inflammation, but percutaneous or laparoscopic drainage may be necessary for larger abscesses (>5 cm). Emergency surgery is required for perforated diverticulitis with peritonitis.

Surgery
Indications for surgery are abscess or fistula formation; and intestinal rupture with peritonitis. These, however, rarely occur. Surgery for abscess or fistula is indicated either urgently or electively. The timing of the elective surgery is determined by evaluating factors such as the stage of the disease, the age of the person, their general medical condition, the severity and frequency of the attacks, and whether symptoms persist after the first acute episode. In most cases, elective surgery is deemed to be indicated when the risks of the surgery are less than the risks of the complications of diverticulitis. Elective surgery is not indicated until at least six weeks after recovery from the acute event. Emergency surgery is indicated for an intestinal rupture with peritonitis.

Technique
The first surgical approach consists of resection and primary anastomosis. This first stage of surgery is performed on people if they have a well-vascularized, nonedematous, and tension-free bowel. The proximal margin should be an area of the pliable colon without hypertrophy or inflammation. The distal margin should extend to the upper third of the rectum where the taenia coalesces. Not all of the diverticula-bearing colon must be removed, since diverticula proximal to the descending or sigmoid colon are unlikely to result in further symptoms.

Approach
Diverticulitis surgery consists of a bowel resection with or without colostomy. Either may be done by the traditional laparotomy or by laparoscopic surgery. The traditional bowel resection is made using an open surgical approach, called colectomy. During a colectomy, the person is placed under general anesthesia. A surgeon performing a colectomy will make a lower midline incision in the abdomen or a lateral lower transverse incision. The diseased section of the large intestine is removed, and then the two healthy ends are sewn or stapled back together. A colostomy may be performed when the bowel has to be relieved of its normal digestive work as it heals. A colostomy implies creating a temporary opening of the colon on the skin surface, and the end of the colon is passed through the abdominal wall with a removable bag attached to it. The waste is collected in the bag.

However, most surgeons prefer performing the bowel resection laparoscopically, mainly because postoperative pain is reduced with faster recovery. Laparoscopic surgery is a minimally invasive procedure in which three to four smaller incisions are made in the abdomen or navel. After incisions into the abdomen are done, placement of trocars occurs which allows a camera and other equipment entry into the peritoneal cavity. The greater omentum is reflected and the affected section of the bowel is mobilized.  Alternately, laparoscopic sigmoid resection (LSR) compared to open sigmoid resection (OSR) showed that LSR is not superior over OSR for acute symptomatic diverticulitis. Furthermore, laparoscopic lavage was as safe as resection for perforated diverticulitis with peritonitis.

Maneuvers
All colon surgery involves only three maneuvers that may vary in complexity depending on the region of the bowel and the nature of the disease. The maneuvers are the retraction of the colon, the division of the attachments to the colon, and the dissection of the mesentery. After the resection of the colon, the surgeon normally divides the attachments to the liver and the small intestine. After the mesenteric vessels are dissected, the colon is divided with special surgical staplers that close off the bowel while cutting between the staple lines.  After resection of the affected bowel segment, an anvil and spike are used to anastomose the remaining segments of the bowel. Anastomosis is confirmed by filling the cavity with normal saline and checking for any air bubbles.

Bowel resection with colostomy
When excessive inflammation of the colon renders primary bowel resection too risky, bowel resection with colostomy remains an option. Also known as the Hartmann's operation, this is a more complicated surgery typically reserved for life-threatening cases. The bowel resection with colostomy implies a temporary colostomy which is followed by a second operation to reverse the colostomy. The surgeon makes an opening in the abdominal wall (a colostomy) which helps clear the infection and inflammation. The colon is brought through the opening and all waste is collected in an external bag.

The colostomy is usually temporary, but it may be permanent, depending on the severity of the case. In most cases several months later, after the inflammation has healed, the person undergoes another major surgery, during which the surgeon rejoins the colon and rectum and reverses the colostomy.

Epidemiology
Diverticulitis most often affects the elderly. In Western countries, diverticular disease most commonly involves the sigmoid colon (95 percent of people with diverticulitis). Diverticulosis affects 5% to 45% of individuals with the prevalence of diverticulosis increasing with age from under 20% of individuals affected at age 40 up to 60% of individuals affected by age 60. 

Left-sided diverticular disease (involving the sigmoid colon) is most common in the West, while right-sided diverticular disease (involving the ascending colon) is more common in Asia and Africa. Among people with diverticulosis, 4 to 15% may go on to develop diverticulitis.

References

External links

 Diverticulosis and diverticulitis at NIDDK
 Diverticulitis at Mayo Clinic
 Staging of Acute Diverticulitis archive of link above

Diseases of intestines
Wikipedia medicine articles ready to translate
Wikipedia emergency medicine articles ready to translate